National Route 13 (officially, PY13, better known as Ruta Trece) is a highway in Paraguay, which runs from Paso Yobai to Ypehú, connecting the departments of Guairá, Caaguazú and Canindeyú.

History
With the Resolution N° 1090/19, it obtained its current number and elevated to National Route in 2019 by the MOPC (Ministry of Public Works and Communications).

Distances, cities and towns

The following table shows the distances traversed by PY13 in each different department, showing cities and towns that it passes by (or near).

References

13